Marchiori is an Italian surname. Notable people with the surname include:

Alberto Marchiori (born 1993), Italian footballer
Domenico Marchiori (1828–1905), Italian painter
Fernando Marchiori (born 1979), Brazilian footballer and manager
Leo Marchiori (1898–1949), Canadian cyclist
Massimo Marchiori (born 1970), Italian mathematician and computer scientist

Italian-language surnames